"Within Me" is a song by Italian gothic metal band Lacuna Coil. It was released as the fourth and final single from their fourth studio album, Karmacode.

The song is a power ballad and the first released as a single by the band.

The release of the single coincided with the start of the Jägermeister Music Tour where the band supported Stone Sour. The song was also performed on MTV2's Headbangers Ball.

Meaning of the song

Release
The music video was released on 10 April 2007. The single was scheduled to be released on 4 May 2007, but it was delayed a week, eventually being released on 11 May 2007, exclusively in the bands native country of Italy.

A different version of the single was released in America on 24 September 2007 and in Japan on 2007 September 25.

Critical reception
The song was generally well received by critics. PopMatters said of the song, "It’s formulaic, but at least this band knows how to work the formula well.". Metal.it described the song as, "è un colpo a sorpresa, un brano che potrebbe essere il prologo dei futuri Lacuna Coil" (It's a surprise, a track that could be a prologue of future Lacuna Coil).

Music video
The video was filmed from 2 to 3 March 2007 in Turin at Borgo Medievale's park and castle and in the Sardinian desert. Band members appear in old style costumes. The video makes use of certain special effects, including artificial rain.
Cristina Scabbia, after having filmed her part, went to the US to film the video for "À Tout le Monde (Set Me Free)" with Megadeth.
The music video was released on 10 April 2007.

 Producer: Melanie Schmidt
 Cinematography: Matteo De Martini
 Production Company: MO Vi DA Entertainment

Formats and track listings
These are the formats and track listings of major single releases of "Within Me".

 Radio promo CD
 "Within Me"
 "Within Me (Instrumental)"

 Italian CD single
 "Within Me"
 "Enjoy the Silence (Live)"
 "When a Dead Man Walks (Live)"

 Japanese CD single
 "Within Me"
 "Virtual Environment"
 "Closer (Acoustic Version)"
 "Tightrope (Live)"
 "Fragile (Live)"
 "To the Edge (Live)"
 "Our Truth (Live)"
 "Heaven's a Lie (Live)"

Release history

Chart

References

Lacuna Coil songs
2006 songs
2007 singles
Rock ballads
Songs written by Andrea Ferro
Songs written by Cristina Scabbia